The Hospital Nacional San Juan de Dios is one of the most important public hospitals in Guatemala. It is located in Quetzaltenango, Guatemala's second largest city.

On July 25, 2000 it hit the news when an outbreak of meningitis killed 15 newborn babies and left three others seriously ill.

References

External links
Wikimapia

Hospitals in Guatemala
Buildings and structures in Quetzaltenango